The Canada national rugby union team represents Canada in men's international rugby union competitions and is governed by Rugby Canada. Canada is classified by World Rugby as a tier two rugby nation and has competed in competitions such as the Americas Rugby Championship and the Rugby World Cup. Canada traditionally plays in red and white.

Canada has been playing international rugby since their 1932 debut against Japan. Canada competed at every World Cup from the inagurual tournament in 1987 until its elimination at the hands of Chile during the 2023 qualifying process, breaking the 3 decades long record of uninterrupted attendance. 

Canada achieved their best result at the World Cup in 1991, where they reached the quarterfinals. Canada was once the dominant power of North American rugby and was the second-best team in the Americas. Before the professionalization of rugby, Canada were known to upset stronger teams, having defeated France, Scotland, Wales, and an uncapped England side prior to 2002.

History

Early years
In 1874 the first North American international game took place in Cambridge, Massachusetts between McGill and Harvard universities. Later that same year a second game was played, but this time Harvard were the hosts, and the game was played with early "American Football" rules. Today, in carrying on the oldest annual sporting competition in North America, McGill University and Harvard University continue the tradition of competing for the Covo Cup, at alternating venues each November, using the original rules of rugby football. McGill University can therefore lay claim to being the oldest rugby club in Canada, but due to rugby's popularity among students and the McGill University Rugby Football Club's affiliation with the university, the claim as the oldest independent rugby club goes to the still active Westmount Rugby Football Club. To this day, the McGill University Rugby Football Club is one of the premier university sides in Canada. Since 1989 the team has won 15 RSEQ (Réseau du sport étudiant du Québec) Titles, including 8 straight from 2006 - 2013. In 2019, the side represented Quebec at the Canadian University Men's Rugby Championship, finishing 6th in the nation. McGill Rugby alumni have gone on to represent Canada on the world stage and join the ranks of professional rugby.

A Canadian Rugby Football Union was established in 1884, although this organisation went on to become the Canadian Football League, as rugby football in Canada evolved into Canadian football. In 1902–1903 the first Canadian team toured Britain. In 1909, Earl Grey, then Governor General of Canada, donated a trophy to the CRU to be awarded for the Rugby Football Championship of Canada. This trophy became known as the Grey Cup. However, the rules used in Canada were vastly different from the rules used in countries that were part of the IRB. In the years that followed, the CRU would legalise forward passing and make other changes that would make Canadian football a totally different sport, similar to American football.

Post-World War I
During World War I and II rugby union was suspended but in the inter-war period there was something of a renaissance. In 1919 a Canadian Services team played overseas against representatives from England, New Zealand, South Africa and Australia. The formation of the Rugby Union of Canada took place in 1929 and this was followed by a tour of Japan by a Canadian representative side in 1932 to help foster trade between the two countries. About half the team were Canadian born (mostly British Columbia players) and the rest were originally from Britain. They lost 9–8 and 38–5 in the two test matches.

The original Canadian Rugby Union disbanded just before World War I. Canada's team to the United Kingdom in 1962 was dominated by British Columbia players. The Rugby Union of Canada was re-formed in 1965 as the Canadian Rugby Union. The 1966 British Lions played a non-cap match in Toronto on their way back from Australia and New Zealand, a match they won 19–8. Canada established themselves as the strongest team in North America, though they struggled to compete with the major test-playing nations in Europe and the Southern Hemisphere.

Modern era

Canada were one of the 16 nations that were invited by the International Rugby Board (IRB) to compete at the inaugural Rugby World Cup in 1987, hosted by both Australia and New Zealand. Canada were grouped with Wales, Ireland and Tonga in Pool 2. In their first ever World Cup match they defeated Tonga 37–4. However they lost their subsequent matches 46–19 to Ireland and 40–9 to Wales, and finished third in the pool (not advancing to the finals).

Canada had to qualify for the 1991 Rugby World Cup. Canada took part in the Americas tournaments, and finished first in the Americas qualifying standings. At the 1991 Rugby World Cup, Canada was placed into Pool D, alongside France, Romania and Fiji. Canada beat Fiji and Romania but lost their fixture against France 19–13 to finish second in the pool, advancing to the quarter-finals. They were then knocked out in the quarter-final by the All Blacks, 29–13. The 1991 tournament stands as Canada's best ever finish in a Rugby World Cup.

Canada beat Wales 26–24 on November 10, 1993, at Cardiff Arms Park; beat France 18–16 on June 4, 1994, at Twin Elms Rugby Park in Nepean, Ontario; battled to a 27–27 draw against Ireland on 27 June 2000 at Markham, Ontario; and chalked up a 26–23 win against Scotland in Vancouver, British Columbia on June 15, 2002. The win over Scotland was the start of a streak of seven victories before losing to Wales in Cardiff.

Canada has never beaten England in six games, but has played their national XV, B team, and Under 23 teams eleven times (for which Canada awarded its players international caps.) The most notable result was a 15–12 victory over a strong England XV on 29 May 1993 at Swangard Stadium in Burnaby. Unfortunately for the Canadians, on the eve of the match England's management chose not to award international caps (due to fact that some players were touring with the British and Irish Lions in New Zealand at the time.) Additionally, before defeating Scotland proper in 2002, Canada beat Scotland XV 24–19 on May 25, 1991, at Saint John, New Brunswick.

As they were quarter finalists in 1991, they automatically qualified for the 1995 Rugby World Cup. They were in Pool A with the hosts South Africa, defending champions Australia, and Romania. Canada finished third in the pool, winning their match against Romania but losing 27–11 to Australia and 20–0 to the Springboks.

Canada won the now defunct Pacific Rim tournament three years in succession in 1996, 1997 and 1998.

Canada finished second in Round 4 of the Americas 1999 Rugby World Cup qualifying, losing only to Argentina, and qualified for the World Cup. Canada finished third in their pool (with France, Fiji and Namibia), winning their match against Namibia but losing their other two fixtures. The victory against Namibia was uncharacteristic for Canada, as they ran the score up to 72–11, one of their most lopsided victories, as there was a very slight statistical chance that they could have advanced on points scored. This thrashing was the one bright light in an otherwise gloomy and disappointing 1999 World Cup performance.

Like all second- and third-tier nations, the Canadians have had problems having these players available for important games. As a consequence Canada has slipped out of the top 10 rugby union nations, but has nevertheless provided top class players such as Dan Baugh, Rod Snow, Mike James, Colin Yukes, Dave Lougheed and Jamie Cudmore to teams in England, Wales and France. The Canadians qualified for the 2003 Rugby World Cup in Australia.

Canada qualified as Americas 1, finishing at the top of Round 4 Americas tournaments, winning five of their six fixtures to enter the 2003 World Cup in Australia, their fifth world cup in a row. Canada's sole win was a 24–7 result against Tonga as they lost their games against Italy, Wales and the All Blacks.

Since 2003 Canada has played host to the Churchill Cup, making the final in 2010 but losing to the England Saxons 38–18. In 2004 and 2005 they replaced China in the Super Powers Cup. For the 2004 Superpowers Cup, Canada was substituted for China. In 2005 the competition was renamed the Super Cup. Canada beat Japan 15–10 in the final.

In 2006 Canada completed the qualification process for the 2007 Rugby World Cup. They were in a three-team group also containing Barbados and the United States. Each played the other once. On 24 June 2006, Canada defeated Barbados 71–3, in Bridgetown, their largest ever win. Canada achieved a record win over the US in the match in Newfoundland on August 12, 2006, defeating the USA 56–7 in front of a capacity crowd, when player James Pritchard scored a national record 36 points with three tries, six conversions and three penalties in the match, beating the record of 29 he had set against Barbados in their previous match. The win assured Canada of a place in the 2007 World Cup as Americas 2 in Pool B. Also that year, a Canadian team won the NA4 and the national team beat the US earlier in the Churchill Cup.

2007 World Cup

Going into the 2007 Rugby World Cup in France, Canada were ranked as severe outsiders, and given odds of 5000/1 to win the tournament. Pool B also contained Australia, Fiji, Japan and Wales. In their opening match on 9 September the Canadians lost 42–17 to Wales. They followed this with a 29–16 loss to Fiji, whom they had needed to beat to have realistic hopes of progressing to the quarterfinals. They drew 12–12 with Japan, conceding an injury-time try by Koji Taira. In their final game they lost 37–6 to an Australian side consisting mostly of second-string players. Canada finished bottom of Pool B, and returned home from a World Cup without winning a single game for the first time ever.

2011 World Cup cycle

Following the 2007 Rugby World Cup Canada hired Kieran Crowley as head coach, and by April 2008 the former New Zealand All Black took over coaching duties.
In Autumn 2008 the Canadians toured Europe, beating Portugal in their opening match, but suffering heavy defeats in their subsequent games in Ireland, Wales and Scotland. In 2009 the Canadians hosted a tour by the Welsh and Irish.

Canada beat the United States in a two-legged playoff game in July 2009 to qualify for the 2011 Rugby World Cup in New Zealand and enter the tournament as Americas 1.

Canada began its Rugby World Cup preparations by finishing runner-up in the 2011 Churchill Cup for the second year in a row, losing 37–6 in the final to the England Saxons (England's second-string side). This good form carried on in a two-legged home and away series against the USA Eagles. In the home leg Canada secured a 28–22 victory in front a record 10,621 fans. In the away leg Canada won 27–7. Their warm-up schedule continued with a match against the Australian Barbarians which featured several of Australia's World Cup squad, and the Barbarians claimed a comfortable 38–14 victory.

The Canadians began their 2011 Rugby World Cup on September 14 against Tonga, winning 25–20. They followed this up with a 46–19 loss to France on September 18. The team had only a four-day turn-around after their first match, and let the game slip out of their reach within the final 20 minutes. They produced a repeat result of 2007, by playing to a 23–23 draw against Japan. Their Rugby World Cup concluded with a 79–15 loss against the All Blacks. Canada finished fourth in their pool, narrowly missing out on automatic qualification for the 2015 Rugby World Cup.

2015 World Cup cycle
Canada secured a spot in the 2015 Rugby World Cup on 23 August 2013, with a 13–11 win over the US, 40–20 on aggregate.

Canada joined Pool D with France, Ireland, Italy and Romania. Canada finished the tournament with zero wins, last in Pool D.

2019 World Cup cycle
At the 2016 Americas Rugby Championship, Canada claimed three wins over Uruguay, Chile and Brazil, and two losses versus Argentina XV and United States. In June 2016, the team defeated Russia and lost to Japan and Italy. In November 2016, Canada was defeated by Ireland, Romania and Samoa.

At the 2017 Americas Rugby Championship, Canada scored a single win versus Chile, and lost the other four matches. In June 2017, the team lost to Georgia and Romania. Later they faced United States for the 2019 World Cup North America play-off, being beaten on aggregate for the first time. In November 2017, Canada lost to the Māori All Blacks, Georgia and Fiji, while defeating Spain.

In 2018, Canada lost both matches versus Uruguay for the 2019 World Cup Americas play-off, therefore the team advanced to the intercontinental repechage which it won, securing the very last spot in the final tournament. The team also lost to United States in the 2018 Americas Rugby Championship.

Canada secured the last spot in the 2019 Rugby World Cup on 23 November 2018, winning all of its three matches of the intercontinental repechage in Marseille, France.

They join 2019 Rugby World Cup Pool B with title holders New Zealand and third-placed team from 2015 South Africa, Italy and the African qualifier, Namibia. They lost their first 3 fixtures by scores of 48–7 to Italy, 63–0 to New Zealand, and 66–7 to South Africa; their last fixture against Namibia was cancelled due to Typhoon Hagibis.

2023 World Cup Cycle and failure to qualify 
Due to the COVID–19 pandemic, the Americas qualifying round was delayed indefinitely before it was abridged and the first fixtures were confirmed for July 2021.

Canada played the United States in a two-game series; Canada won in thumping fashion in St. John's, winning by a score of 34–21; however, they scuttled in the return leg in Glendale, Colorado, losing by a score of 38–16, with the Americans dominating the game from start to finish. Canada lost the aggregate 50–59 and were drawn to play Chile in a two-game series for the second Americas spot. While Canada once again won the first leg, they only did so by a score of 22–21. Canada would lose the second leg in Santiago by a score of 33–24 (their first ever loss to Chile), which eliminated Canada from qualifying, marking the first time ever that Canada failed to qualify for the Rugby World Cup.

Stadium and attendance
The national team currently does not have a permanent home stadium and as such play their matches at various locations across Canada. BMO Field in Toronto, Ontario has been proposed as the national team's home stadium, despite not providing a suitable rugby climate year-round.

In August 2011 it was announced that the national team would have a permanent training centre located in Langford, British Columbia.

The highest attended matches in Canada involving the Canadian national team are:

Record

World Cup

Canada has played in every Rugby World Cup since the inaugural 1987 tournament, always qualifying during the first round. However, for 2019, they have failed to qualify during the first two rounds, and can only qualify through the 4-team repechage in November 2018.

Overall

Below is table of the representative rugby matches played by a Canada national XV at test level up until 22 November 2022.

Wins against Tier 1 nations
The following is a list of Canada's wins against Tier 1 countries:

Canada also achieved a 27–27 draw against Ireland on 27 June 2000 at Markham, Ontario.

Players

Current squad
On November 2nd, Kingsley Jones announced a 36-man camp roster in preparation for the Canadian Senior Men's 2022 end-of-year rugby union internationals against the Netherlands and Namibia.

Head coach:  Kingsley Jones
 Caps Updated: 3 July 2022

Player records

Most caps

Last updated: Canada vs Namibia, 19 November 2022. Statistics include officially capped matches only.

Most tries

Last updated: Canada vs Namibia, 19 November 2022. Statistics include officially capped matches only.

Most points

Last updated: Canada vs Namibia, 19 November 2022. Statistics include officially capped matches only.
Note, Gareth Rees points total is in dispute, some sources claim 487 while others including World Rugby claim 491.

Most matches as captain

Last updated: Canada vs Namibia, 19 November 2022. Statistics include officially capped matches only.

Most points in a match

Last updated: Canada vs Namibia, 19 November 2022. Statistics include officially capped matches only.

Most tries in a match

Last updated: Canada vs Namibia, 19 November 2022. Statistics include officially capped matches only.

Past coaches

Upcoming fixtures and recent results

Upcoming fixtures

Recent results

Green background indicates a win. Red background indicates a loss. Yellow background indicates a draw.

See also

 List of Canada national rugby union team test matches
 List of Canada national rugby union players
 Rugby union in Canada
 Rugby Canada
 Canadian Rugby Championship
 Canada national rugby sevens team
 Canadian football

References

External links
 Rugby Canada's Home Page
 Canadian rugby union news from Planet Rugby
 Canadian rugby world cup news from theRugbyWorldCup.co.uk
 World Cup Preview
 Canada qualify for 2015 RWC